Gabriel Ruozzi (27 March 1914 – 14 September 1988) was a French racing cyclist. He rode in the 1935 Tour de France.

References

1914 births
1988 deaths
French male cyclists
Place of birth missing